Undoolya is a suburb of the town of Alice Springs, in the Northern Territory, Australia.

References

Suburbs of Alice Springs